The flags of the 15 counties of Estonia are all white and green, with the coat of arms of the respective county on the white part. This design was first established in 1938. The list also includes the historical flag of Petseri County, which in 1944 was occupied by Soviet forces and became Pechorsky District in Pskov Oblast, present-day Russia. The district was claimed by Estonia after the re-establishing of independence in 1991, but the claim was dropped in 1995.

The flags

See also
 Flag of Estonia

References

Flags
Estonia, Counties
Flags
Flags of Estonia
Estonia